Stockdalewath is a small village in Cumbria, approximately 7.5 miles south of Carlisle in the extreme northwest of England. It is located on the River Roe, and is in the civil parish of Dalston.

As of the 2011 census, the population is estimated to be 74.

Archaeological evidence, mostly based on aerial surveys of crop marks, suggests that Stockdalewath was a rural settlement in Roman Cumbria. Within a half mile of the village are three camps thought to be Roman, with the names Castlesteads, Stoneraise, and Whitestones. They are equal distance from each other and form a triangle.

Notable people
 Susanna Blamire, poet known as The Muse of Cumberland; raised in Stockdalewath

See also
Listed buildings in Dalston, Cumbria

References

Sources

External links

Roe Beck level at Stockdalewath

Villages in Cumbria
Dalston, Cumbria
Inglewood Forest